|}

The Great Voltigeur Stakes is a Group 2 flat horse race in Great Britain open to three-year-old colts and geldings. It is run at York over a distance of 1 mile 3 furlongs and 188 yards (2,385 metres), and it is scheduled to take place each year in August.

History
The event is named after Voltigeur, the Yorkshire-trained winner of the Derby and St Leger in 1850. It was established in 1950, and it was initially called the Voltigeur Stakes. The word "Great" was added to the title in 1957.

The Great Voltigeur Stakes serves as a trial for the following month's St Leger, and fourteen horses have achieved victory in both races. The first was Premonition in 1953, and the most recent was Logician in 2019.

The event is currently held on the opening day of York's four-day Ebor Festival meeting.

Records
Leading jockey (9 wins):
 Lester Piggott – Pindari (1959), St Paddy (1960), Ragazzo (1965), Meadowville (1970), Athens Wood (1971), Our Mirage (1972), Alleged (1977), Noble Saint (1979), Prince Bee (1980)

Leading trainer (7 wins):
 Sir Michael Stoute – Electric (1982), Sacrament (1994), Fantastic Light (1999), Air Marshall (2000), Hard Top (2005), Sea Moon (2011), Telescope (2013)

Winners

See also
 Horse racing in Great Britain
 List of British flat horse races

References
 Paris-Turf: 
 Racing Post:
 galopp-sieger.de – Great Voltigeur Stakes.
 ifhaonline.org – International Federation of Horseracing Authorities – Great Voltigeur Stakes (2019).
 pedigreequery.com – Great Voltigeur Stakes – York.
 

Flat races in Great Britain
York Racecourse
Flat horse races for three-year-olds
Recurring sporting events established in 1950
1950 establishments in England